The 1890–91 season was Sunderland's 11th season in existence, and their first season as a Football League club. Sunderland were elected into the league for the beginning of its third season, in place of Stoke City who had finished bottom in 1889–90.

Although bottom by mid December, Sunderland had a strong second half of the season, losing only once in the new year and finishing in seventh place (out of twelve). They would have finished fifth were they not deducted two points for failing to register goalkeeper Ned Doig ahead of the game at West Brom.

Sunderland went on a cup run, reaching their first ever FA Cup Semi-final, losing in a replay to Notts County. Sunderland declined to enter their first team into the Durham Challenge Cup, instead opting to send Sunderland 'A'.

First team squad

Competitions

Football League

League table

Matches

FA Cup

Matches

Squad Statistics

|}

References

 All the Lads: A Complete Who's Who of Sunderland A.F.C., Dykes, Gareth & Lamming, Douglas, Polar Print Group Ltd, 1999
 Sunderland AFC: The Official History 1879–2000, Days, Paul, Business Education Publishers Ltd, 1999
 The StatCat, www.thestatcat.co.uk, last accessed: 2018-11-02

Sunderland A.F.C. seasons
Sunderland